Chitrali Bazaar is a bazaar located in the city of Peshawar, Pakistan. The handicrafts available at Chitrali Bazaar include traditional apparel, jewelry, pottery, and textiles. The market is a destination for both tourists and locals.

Common items at the market include traditional Chitrali caps, which are crafted from wool obtained in the area and include elaborate stitching. The hats are available in several styles and hues.

History
The bazaar is named after Chitralis.

References

Bazaars in Peshawar
Market towns in Pakistan
Tourist attractions in Peshawar
Shopping districts and streets in Pakistan